Dryobius sexnotatus is a species of beetle in the family Cerambycidae. It is the only species in the monospecific genus Dryobius.

Taxonomic history
The species was initially described by Thomas Say, who named it Callidium 6-fasciatum. He placed it in the genus Callidium. In 1850, John Lawrence LeConte transferred the species to be the sole member of his newly-circumscribed genus Dryobius, making the name D. 6-fasciatus. LeConte emended the specific name from 6-fasciatus to sexfasciatus in 1859.

In 1957, Earle Gorton Linsley coined the nomen novum Dryobius sexnotatus for this species as there was already a senior homonym with the same specific name used by a beetle described by Guillaume-Antoine Olivier prior to Say's description.

Distribution
Most specimens of D. sexnotatus come from the Ohio River Valley, but it has been documented in at least fourteen states in the eastern United States.

Biology
Its larvae eat maple, beech, basswood, and elm trees.

Its flight period ranges from early March through early September, but is most common from mid-June through mud-July.

The pheromones produced by males include 1-(1H–pyrrol-2-yl)-1,2-propanedione and (R)-3-hydroxyhexan-2-one.

References

Cerambycinae
Beetles described in 1957
Beetles of the United States